Vivienne Medrano (born October 28, 1992), also known by her online alias VivziePop, is an American animator, illustrator, comic creator and voice actress. She is best known as the creator of the adult animated series Hazbin Hotel and Helluva Boss.

Career

Early work
Prior to joining YouTube, Medrano did assistant work on a thesis horror comedy film by Zach Bellissimo titled Blanderstein, in 2011.

Medrano launched her YouTube channel under the screen name "VivziePop" in 2012, building a dedicated online audience, who enjoyed her fanwork and original creations. In 2013, she started a webcomic titled ZooPhobia, which ultimately ran until 2016, ending so that she could find more time to develop Hazbin Hotel. Medrano directed her first short animated film, titled "Son of 666" in 2013. Medrano released her fourth year thesis film entitled "Timber" in 2014, for which she won a Dusty Award in "Outstanding Achievement in Character Animation". Medrano named the film after the song by Pitbull and Kesha, and its score had homages to the song as well. In October 2014, she released an animated music video for the song "Die Young" by Kesha, which accumulated over 50 million views by October 2019. As a result, she became "relatively well-known" online for her animation and artwork, some of which she shared on her channel.

Medrano received a Bachelor in Fine Arts and graduated from School of Visual Arts in August 2014. She worked as a freelance animator for two years. She continued to work on her webcomic ZooPhobia until 2016, when she ended it in order to focus her attention on Hazbin Hotel. Hazbin Hotel would be crowdfunded through Patreon, allowing her to hire a small team and collaborate with specialists so the show would have a "high production value". It also allowed her to create merchandise for the show, thus leading to more funds.

SpindleHorse Toons
Medrano founded the animation studio SpindleHorse Toons, under which the pilot for Hazbin Hotel, the pilot and first season for Helluva Boss, and several animated shorts would be released. Medrano serves as the director, writer and character designer for SpindleHorse Toons. Medrano released the first trailer for Hazbin Hotel in April 2018.

In February 2019, her channel had amassed over 1.2 million subscribers. By April 2019, it was reported that total views on her channel had reached more than 163 million. In an interview with Cartoon Brew, she said that much of the Hazbin Hotel pilot was funded by money from her Patreon, rather than income from YouTube's algorithm. The company Horseless Cowboy assisted Medrano with voice casting during the first season of Helluva Boss, with Richard Steven Horvitz serving as the voice director. Lucas Bermudez of Screen Rant attributed the success of Hazbin Hotel as the sole reason for Helluva Boss being greenlit.

In October 2019, the pilot episode of Hazbin Hotel was released on Medrano's YouTube channel. Within two days of the pilot's release, it garnered over 2 million views. In November 2019, the pilot of Helluva Boss was released on her YouTube channel as well. Medrano stated that, while the two shows share a setting, Hazbin Hotel is about "redemption and consequences of past actions", while Helluva Boss follows "characters and societies that already exist in Hell" with the main focus being on the relationships between characters.

In July 2020, Medrano released an animated music video for Hazbin Hotel called "Addict", featuring the Silva Hound song of the same name.

In August 2020, Hazbin Hotel was picked up for a full series by A24. At that time, Cartoon Brew reported that the pilot for the series had been viewed over 41 million times and that her channel had accumulated over 3.6 million subscribers, noting that she "developed and produced her "original pilot without any studio involvement". Animation Magazine said that A24 was taking a "bold step" by picking up the series.

On September 30, 2020, Medrano released an animated short film titled "Bad Luck Jack", based on her webcomic ZooPhobia. The short was nominated and won for a Ursa Major Award in the "Best Dramatic Short Work" category. The short was also listed as a "Recommended Anthropomorphic Dramatic Short Work" on the Ursa Major Award website.

In October 2020, the first episode of the first season for Helluva Boss began, almost one year after the original release of its pilot. Eight episodes were ordered, all of which would be released on her YouTube channel for free. Animation Magazine reported that the pilots of Hazbin Hotel and Helluva Boss had been, collectively, viewed over 65 million times by October 7.

In February 2021, Medrano told Insider that Helluva Boss remains independent of Hazbin Hotel, saying that she intended to keep it that way as "long as the audience wants to keep seeing it", adding that they have "a plan for where the story goes and ends", noting that having an ending seems "surreal".

In September 2021, Medrano spoke on a virtual stage at the Animation Exposé of the Ottawa International Animation Festival about creating Hazbin Hotel and Helluva Boss. She was joined by Bryan Dimas, the associate producer of development at Warner Bros. Animation and co-director of a group called LatinX in Animation.

On March 3, 2022, Medrano said that many of the artists who worked on the Hazbin Hotel pilot would be returning for the first season and argued that "indie spirit of the pilot lives on." Along with SpindleHorse Toons, Princess Bento Studio, a studio created by Bento Box Entertainment and Princess Pictures, will be producing the series. In late February and mid-March, redesigns of Alastor and Charlie had been released on the official Twitter account of Hazbin Hotel. On April 29, 2022, the official Twitter account of Hazbin Hotel released an image of Angel Dust's new design. On May 31, 2022, the official Twitter account posted an image of Vaggie's redesign, calling her the "protector of the hotel." Further previews of the series were released, mostly by Medrano, in December 2022, January 2023, and March 2023.

Other work
In February 2017, she shared an illustration of a Lego Joker, which Inverse called "grotesque yet adorable," saying it captures the "complicated love-hate relationship between the Clown Prince of Crime and the Dark Knight". From 2017 to 2019, she worked as an animator on Nico Colaleo's DreamWorksTV series, Too Loud. She called her experience on the series "a delight." She also worked as a character designer on the series.

In 2019, Medrano was interviewed for the documentary titled "Hand-Drawn: 2D Animation Documentary". In March 2021, it was reported that she was a partner of Redefine Entertainment, a management company formed by Jairo Alvarado, Tony Gil, and Max Goldfarb.

In May 2022, LatinX in Animation announced that Medrano would hold a "cafecito" on June 3, 2022 during Animation Day at the 21st Los Angeles Latino International Film Festival.

In February 2023, Medrano appeared at Level Up Expo, also known as LVL UP EXPO, a gaming convention.

Personal life
Medrano was born in Frederick, Maryland and is a Salvadoran American. She became interested in animation when she watched the movie Bambi. She began using art programs such as MS Paint in third grade. Her early art was heavily influenced by Invader Zim. Medrano moved to New York City and began attending School of Visual Arts in September 2010 and would later graduate in 2014. Medrano is bisexual.

Filmography

Film

Web series

References

External links

1992 births
Living people
American women animators
YouTube animators
Female comics writers
YouTube channels launched in 2012
People from Frederick, Maryland
School of Visual Arts alumni
American people of Salvadoran descent
American surrealist artists
Bisexual artists
Bisexual actresses
LGBT animators
LGBT people from Maryland
LGBT film directors
American LGBT screenwriters
American bisexual actors
LGBT Hispanic and Latino American people
LGBT YouTubers